The Suriname national korfball team is managed by the Suriname Korfball Federation (SKF), representing Suriname in korfball international competitions. It participated in its first international korfball competition in 2018.

Tournament history

References

National korfball teams
K
Korfball in Suriname